Maria Schüppel (1923 – 27 June 2011) was a German composer, educator, pianist and pioneering music therapist who  composed works for lyre and voice, and experimented with electronic music.

Schüppel was born in Chemnitz. After her father’s death, her family moved to Gorlitz, where she studied piano with Eberhard Wenzel. She later studied music in Dresden, Breslau, and Weimar, and passed her state examination in Weimar in 1945. She worked as a music teacher and at Weimar Radio, composing art songs and folk songs. In 1950, Schüppel found a job in East Berlin, where she gave harpsichord and clavichord recitals and studied the trautonium (an early electronic synthesizer) with Oskar Sala. She worked at the German University of Music (today the Hanns-Eisler-Musikhochschule) until 1957 when she moved to West Berlin to focus on music therapy. She traveled throughout Europe and studied or collaborated with Hans Heinrich Engel, Karl Konig, Anny von Lange, Hermann Pfrogner, Edmund Pracht, Gotthard Starke, and Rudolph Treichler.

Together with Heldegard Prym, Schüppel developed the anthroposophical music therapy (AnMt) training course in Berlin at the Musiktherapeutische Arbeitsstätte (Center for Music Therapy) in 1963 and directed it until 1993. AnMt was based on an approach developed by Rudolph Steiner to address the patient’s spiritual health as well as his or her physical health. In 1994, the German Society of Music Therapy awarded Schüppel with honorary membership for her work in developing the field of music therapy.

Schüppel’s compositions included:

Chamber 

Mercury Bath (lyre)
Music in Three Movements in the Baroque Style (lyre)
Suite (lyre)
Zweistimmige Fassung der Festmusiken (soprano and alto lyres)

Vocal 

art songs
“Auf dem Mond” (voice and lyre)
folk songs
“Solve et Coagula: Raunendes Feuer” (voice and electronics; text is Feuerlied from the Celtic myth “Die Kinder des LIr”)

References

External links 
Listen to music by Maria Schüppel

German women composers
Music therapists
1923 births
2011 deaths